Party Legends is an American live action/animated series that aired on Viceland, where celebrities narrate crazy, often-drug-induced, true stories of things that happened to them at parties. The series premiered on July 7, 2016.

Episodes

Season 1 (2016)
 What Are You Into? (July 7, 2016) (Alia Shawkat, Jon Daly, Chris Pontius, Kid Ink)
 Making Mistakes (July 14, 2016) (Eric André, Earl Sweatshirt, Margaret Cho, Lizzo)
 Am I in the Morgue? (July 21, 2016) (Fred Armisen, Bushwick Bill, Ryan Sickler, Bridget Everett)
 Clearly On Another Dimension (July 28, 2016) (T.J. Miller, Kreayshawn, Erin McGathy, David Pajo)
 Some Weird Loophole (August 4, 2016) (Dennis Rodman, JD Samson, Dave England, Har Mar Superstar)
 Nude Dude Walking Through (August 11, 2016) (Bobcat Goldthwait, Estelle, Sean Patton, Rory Scovel, Howard Kremer)

Season 2 (2017)
 Sexy Kurt Cobain (June 8, 2017) (Soko, BJ the Chicago Kid, Paul Scheer, Ice-T)
 The Problem With Rap Music Today (June 15, 2017) (Ninja of Die Antwoord, Clare O'Kane, Artie Lange, Mark Gonzales)
 Breaking Bad Vibes (June 22, 2017) (Theophilus London, Duncan Trussell, Derek Waters, Nikki Glaser, Kansas Bowling)
 Beating Arsenio in the Chest Repeatedly (June 29, 2017) (Nancy Whang, Kool Keith, David Gborie, Fetty Wap)
 Greased Up Like a Chicken (July 6, 2017) (ATL Twins, The Kid Mero, Chilli, Prince Markie Dee)
 That's Plant Food (July 13, 2017) (Sam Jay, Andy Dick, Killer Mike, Matt Walsh, Angel Deradoorian, Jon Wurster)
 No Shortage of Boobs at this Party (July 20, 2017) (Natasha Lyonne, Jimmy O. Yang, Desus, Mike Watt)
 Instinct is Automatic (July 27, 2017) (Ghostface Killah, Big Boi, Kim Gordon, Nina Tarr)

See also
Greatest Party Story Ever

References

2010s American adult animated television series
2010s American animated comedy television series
2010s American anthology television series
2016 American television series debuts
2017 American television series endings
American adult animation anthology series
American adult animated comedy television series
American flash adult animated television series
English-language television shows
Viceland original programming
American television series with live action and animation
Storytelling television shows